Usnea intermedia, the western bushy beard, is a grayish-yellowish pale green, irregularly much-branching, stiff shrubby fruticose lichen commonly anchored on holdfasts on trees, often on oaks. Abundant apothecia are convex discs with a ring or thallus-like margin having tendril-like fringe radiating from it. It was formerly called U. arizonica in North America.

References

intermedia
Lichen species
Lichens of North America
Taxa named by Abramo Bartolommeo Massalongo
Lichens described in 1856